Dulquer Salmaan (/d̪ulkʰr̩ salmaːn/; born 28 July 1983) is an Indian actor,  playback singer and film producer who predominantly works in Malayalam and Tamil films in addition to Telugu and Hindi films. He graduated with a bachelor's degree in business management from Purdue University and worked as a business manager in Dubai before pursuing a career in acting. Dulquer is a recipient of several awards including, four Filmfare Awards South and a Kerala State Film Award.

After a three-month acting course at the Barry John Acting Studio, Salmaan made his acting debut with Second Show (2012). He has since established himself as a leading actor in Indian cinema with several critically and commercially successful films including Ustad Hotel (2012), ABCD (2013), Neelakasham Pachakadal Chuvanna Bhoomi (2013), Vaayai Moodi Pesavum (2014), Bangalore Days (2014), Vikramadithyan (2014), O Kadhal Kanmani (2015), Charlie (2015), Kali (2016), Jomonte Suvisheshangal (2017), Mahanati (2018), Kurup (2021) and Sita Ramam (2022).

He has been recognised in the media as a fashion icon and an auto enthusiast. He owns several entrepreneurship ventures and promotes various social causes. He is also the founder of the film production company Wayfarer Films.

Early life and family

Dulquer Salmaan was born on 28 July 1983 in Kochi. He completed his primary level education at Toc-H Public School, Vyttila, Kochi and his secondary level education at Sishya School in Chennai. He has a bachelor's degree in Business Management from Purdue University and worked at an IT firm in Dubai. Later, he decided to pursue a career in acting and attended a three-month course at the Barry John Acting Studio in Mumbai. He stated in a 2012 interview that he chose acting because "somewhere down the lane, my life became monotonous and routine".

Acting career

Early years (2012–13)

In 2011, Salmaan signed on for debutante Srinath Rajendran's crime film Second Show (2012) in which he played the role of Harilal, a gangster. When asked in an interview about his "unconventional entry with a bunch of newcomers", Salmaan stated that it was his conscious decision as he felt that " ... when an actor debuts, he has to earn the right to be a hero and not get it through a shortcut route." The film received mixed reviews.

Salmaan next starred in Anwar Rasheed's Ustad Hotel (2012). The film, which received the National Film Award for Best Popular Film Providing Wholesome Entertainment, was also a major commecial success at the box office. He also won widespread praise for his portrayal of Faizy, a budding chef. For his performance, Salmaan won the Filmfare Award for Best Male Debut – Malayalam, in addition to his first nomination for the Filmfare Award for Best Actor – Malayalam. His third film was Theevram, a crime thriller directed by Roopesh Peethambaran. The film, which released in November 2012, was a box office failure.

In 2013, he signed on to appear in Martin Prakkat's comedy-drama ABCD: American-Born Confused Desi in which he made his singing debut with "Johnny Mone Johnny". Both the song and the film became popular. Though the film received mixed reviews, his performance was well received by critics. Sify stated: "It is Dulquer Salmaan's show all the way and in all fairness the young actor has given his heart and soul into his character." He was also part of Amal Neerad's segment Kullante Bharya in the anthology film 5 Sundarikal (2013). Salmaan then collaborated with Sameer Thahir in Neelakasham Pachakadal Chuvanna Bhoomi (2013), a road film. Salmaan starred in his "first love story", cinematographer Alagappan's romantic drama Pattam Pole (2013), which was a commercial failure.

2014–present
In 2014, Salmaan took on another romantic role in Salalah Mobiles, with Nazriya Nazim opposite him; like Pattam Pole, Salalah Mobiles could not garner much success for the actor. Salmaan's next appearance was in the Tamil-Malayalam bilingual Vaayai Moodi Pesavum (2014). While the Malayalam version Samsaaram Aarogyathinu Haanikaram was received poorly, the Tamil version received positive reviews and became a sleeper hit. IANS said Salmaan is "a treat to watch" and added, "he earns extra brownie points for dubbing in his own voice and speaking flawless Tamil." He won the Filmfare Award for Best Male Debut – Tamil for his performance in the film.

In Anjali Menon's ensemble romantic comedy drama Bangalore Days (2014), Salmaan played Arjun with Nivin Pauly and Nazriya Nazim as his cousins. Later that year, he co-starred with Unni Mukundan in Lal Jose's Vikramadithyan. He then starred in what he called his "most challenging film yet" in Renjith's period drama Njaan (2014). His performance received favourable reviews and earned him several accolades, including his second Best Actor – Malayalam nomination at Filmfare.

In 2015, he acted opposite Nithya Menen in two films—Jenuse Mohamed's romantic comedy 100 Days of Love, and Mani Ratnam's Tamil romantic drama O Kadhal Kanmani. Of Salmaan's performance, The Hindu critic Baradwaj Rangan wrote: "Dulquer Salmaan checks off all boxes in the 'Can You Be The Next Madhavan?' questionnaire", though he believed the film belonged primarily to Menen. Salmaan next played the titular character in Martin Prakkat's Charlie (2015). The film won eight Kerala State Film Awards, including Best Actor for Salmaan, in addition to his third Best Actor – Malayalam nomination at Filmfare.

Salmaan reunited with Sameer Thahir for his first release in 2016, Kali co-starring Sai Pallavi. When released, the film earned the highest opening day box office gross for a Malayalam film. He then starred in Rajeev Ravi's action drama Kammatipaadam (2016). The film garnered critical acclaim and became his third consecutive financial success in two years. He jointly won the Filmfare Award for Best Actor (Critics) – Malayalam for his performance in both films.

He then appeared in Sathyan Anthikad's family drama Jomonte Suvisheshangal (2017). Despite comparisons with the 2016 Malayalam drama Jacobinte Swargarajyam, the film did well commercially. His next appearance was in Amal Neerad's action-adventure film Comrade in America (2017). The Hindu called it "Dulquer's big hit of 2017". He then portrayed four roles in the Malayalam-Tamil bilingual anthology Solo (2017) directed by Bejoy Nambiar. The film was critically panned and faced immense backlash from the audience. He next featured in the Telugu film Mahanati, a biopic on actress Savitri. His Telugu debut, the film opened to highly positive reviews from critics and emerged as a commercial success at the box office. Salmaan's portrayal of Gemini Ganesan was acclaimed, and earned him the Filmfare Award for Best Actor (Critics) – Telugu, in addition to his first nomination for the Filmfare Award for Best Actor – Telugu. Later that year, Salmaan made his Hindi film debut with Karwaan, co-starring alongside Irrfan Khan and Mithila Palkar. Though the film received mixed reviews, Salmaan's performance was appreciated.

In 2019, he starred in Oru Yamandan Premakadha a Malayalam romantic comedy film directed by B. C. Noufal. which was a big flop. After Karwaan, Salmaan's next Bollywood film The Zoya Factor released in September 2019. Abhishek Sharma's film adaptation of Anuja Chauhan's novel The Zoya Factor did not perform well at the box-office but Salmaan's performance was appreciated. The Times of India stated: "From being playful to intense, Dulquer steals the show as he is absolutely brilliant in his portrayal".

Salmaan's 2020 projects included the Tamil film Kannum Kannum Kollaiyadithaal, which earned him his first nomination for the Filmfare Award for Best Actor – Tamil. In 2020, his production company Wayfarer films was launched. His first released project as a producer and actor was the family drama Varane Avashyamund where he co-starred alongside Suresh Gopi, Shobana and Kalyani Priyadarshan. The film hit the screens in 2020 and garnered positive reviews.

Other project of him as a producer is Shamzu Zayba's romantic-comedy Maniyarayile Ashokan which is produced through his production company Wayfarer Films, and starring Jacob Gregory and Anupama Parameswaran. He starred in the 2021 crime-thriller Kurup in which he played the titular role of Sukumara Kurup, also marks his third production venture which has become the highest grossing Malayalam film in 2021 and the highest-grossing film of his career.

In March 2022, his film Salute was released in SonyLIV. He next starred in the Telugu-language period romantic drama Sita Ramam opposite Mrunal Thakur. Despite being a Malayali, he dubbed in all the languages in which the film was released, thus becoming a prominent pan-Indian actor with the film. The film and his performance received widespread critical acclaim and the film proved to be a major commercial success at the box-office. His Bollywood psychological crime thriller Chup: Revenge of the Artist hit theatres in September 2022. His upcoming projects include Guns & Gulaabs, a Netflix series and King of Kotha.

Personal life and off-screen work
On 22 December 2011, he married architect Amal Sufiya in an arranged marriage. Amal comes from a North Indian Muslim family settled in Chennai. The couple has a daughter born in May 2017.

He has acted in a short film as part of the Kerala motor vehicle department's safe riding campaign. He donated 150 items, including clothing, shoes, books, school supplies and crockery items, as a part of the Chennai Gives initiative. In addition, he used to run a web portal for trading cars, and a dental business chain in Chennai. He also is the director of the Bangalore-based Motherhood Hospital.

In the media
Dulquer Salmaan was ranked fourth by GQ in their listing of the 50 most influential young Indians of 2016. He was also featured by GQ in their listing of the Best Dressed Men India 2016. He was selected as the "Most Desirable Man" in 2013 and 2014 by Kochi Times, a subsidiary of The Times Group. In 2019, Salmaan became the first actor from Kerala to get featured on the October edition cover of Vogue India.

Filmography

As an actor

Web series

Other crew positions

Discography

Awards and nominations

Notes

References

External links

 
 

1986 births
Living people
Indian male film actors
Male actors in Malayalam cinema
Male actors in Tamil cinema
Male actors in Hindi cinema
Male actors in Telugu cinema
Male actors from Kochi
Filmfare Awards South winners
Krannert School of Management alumni
21st-century Indian male actors
South Indian International Movie Awards winners
Kerala State Film Award winners
Age controversies